Prajñā or paññā, is a Buddhist term often translated as "wisdom", "intelligence", or "understanding". It is described in Buddhist texts as the understanding of the true nature of phenomena. In the context of Buddhist meditation, it is the ability to understand the three characteristics of all things: anicca ("impermanence"), dukkha ("dissatisfaction" or "suffering"), and anattā ("non-self"). Mahāyāna texts describe it as the understanding of śūnyatā ("emptiness"). It is part of the Threefold Training in Buddhism, and is one of the ten pāramīs of Theravāda Buddhism and one of the six Mahāyāna pāramitās.

Etymology
Prajñā is often translated as "wisdom", but according to Buddhist bioethics scholar Damien Keown, it is closer in meaning to "insight", "non-discriminating knowledge", or "intuitive apprehension".

 jñā can be translated as "consciousness", "knowledge", or "understanding". 
 Pra is an intensifier which can be translated as "higher", "greater", "supreme" or "premium", or "being born or springing up", referring to a spontaneous type of knowing.

Pali scholars T. W. Rhys Davids and William Stede define paññā (Sanskrit: prajñā) as "intelligence, comprising all the higher faculties of cognition" and "intellect as conversant with general truths". British Buddhist monk and Pāli scholar Ñāṇamoli Bhikkhu translates Prajñā (Pāli: paññā), as "understanding", specifically the "state of understanding". Ñāṇamoli Bhikkhu notes that Pāli makes a distinction between the "state of understanding" (paññā) and the "act of understanding" (pajānana) in a way different than English does.

Role in Buddhist traditions
Paññā is the fourth virtue of ten pāramīs found in late canonic (Khuddaka Nikāya) and Theravādan commentary, and the sixth of the six Mahāyāna pāramitās. It is the third level of the Threefold Training in Buddhism consisting of sīla, samādhi, and paññā.

Theravada Buddhism
Theravada Buddhist commentator Acariya Dhammapala describes paññā as the comprehension of the characteristics of things or phenomena with skillful means. Dhammapala states that paññā has the attribute of penetrating the true nature of phenomena.

Abhidharma commentaries relate that there are three types of paññā.

 Learned paññā (Pāli: suta-maya-paññā), or knowledge or wisdom that is acquired from books or listening to others.
 Reflective paññā (Pāli: cinta-maya-paññā), or knowledge or wisdom that is acquired from thought or logic and reasoning.
Paññā from spiritual development (Pāli: bhāvanā-maya-paññā), or knowledge or wisdom that is acquired from direct spiritual experience. Fifth-century Theravada commentator Buddhaghosa states that this category of knowledge is produced from higher meditative absorptions.

Thai Buddhist monk and meditation-master Ajahn Lee classifies the first two types of paññā as Dhamma on the theory-level and the last as Dhamma on the practice-level. Ajahn Lee states that this results in two levels of paññā: mundane paññā which is the comprehension of worldly and Dhamma subjects, and transcendent paññā which is an awareness of the supramundane that is realized by enlightened beings.

Abhidharma commentaries describe seven ways to gain paññā.

 Asking a wise person
 Keeping things clean
 Balancing the five faculties (faith, energy, mindfulness, concentration and wisdom)
 Avoiding foolish people
 Associating with wise people
 Reflecting on and analyzing the Dhamma
 Having the mind inclined towards developing wisdom

Vipassanā Paññā 
Buddhaghosa states in his commentary and meditation treatise, the Visuddhimagga, that there are many different types and aspects of paññā but does not define them all. Buddhaghosa specifies paññā in relation to Buddhist meditation as being specifically vipassanā-paññā ("insight wisdom"). Vipassanā-paññā meaning insight knowledge endowed with virtue.

Buddhaghosa defines vipassanā-paññā as “knowing in a particular mode separate from the modes of perceiving (sañjānana) and cognizing (vijjānana).”. Buddhaghosa makes the analogy of how a child, villager and money-changer sees money to explain his definition. The child can perceive (sañjānana) coins through the senses but does not know the value, the villager knows the value of the coins and is conscious (vijjānana) of the coins' characteristics as a medium of exchange, and the money-changer has an understanding (paññā) of the coins that is even deeper than the surface understanding the villager has because the money-changer can identify which coins are real or fake, which village created it, etc.

Paññā in the context of Buddhist meditation is described as essentially being the ability to understand the three characteristics of all things, namely impermanence, suffering and non-self. Buddhaghoṣa states that the function of paññā is "to abolish the darkness of delusion" in order to understand the "individual essence of states".

Mahāyāna Buddhism

Buddhist-studies scholar Paul Williams states that Mahayana Buddhist tradition considers the analysis of prajñā found in the Abhidharma texts to be incomplete. According to Williams, the Abhidharma description of prajñā stops at the discernment of dharmas as the final reality, but Mahayana and some non-Mahayana schools go on to teach that all dharmas are empty (dharma-śūnyatā). Buddhist scholar John Makransky describes dharmas in this sense to mean "phenomena". Williams goes on to say that the meaning of prajñā according to Mahayana Prajñāpāramitā sutras is ultimately the state of understanding emptiness (śūnyatā).  Religious studies scholar Dale S. Wright points to the Heart Sutra which states that those who want "to practice the profound perfection of wisdom (prajñā) should view things in this way [as empty]". Wright states this view is not wisdom, but having the view will make you wise. According to Williams, Indo-Tibetan Buddhist tradition also has another understanding of prajñā, that is a meditative absorption or state of consciousness that results from analysis and leads to the ultimate truth.

See also
 Four Noble Truths
 Noble Eightfold Path
 Sacca (truth)
 Adhiṭṭhāna (resolute determination)
 Dāna (generosity)
 Passaddhi (tranquillity)
 Nekkhamma (renunciation)
 Upekkhā (equanimity)
 Khanti (patience)
 Metta (loving-kindness)
 Vīrya (diligence)
 Bodhipakkhiya dhamma (Qualities conducive to Enlightenment)
 Kenshō
 Five wisdoms
 Four ways of knowing

References

Sources

Published sources

Web-sources

External links

 What is Prajna?

Nondualism
Wisdom
Sanskrit words and phrases
Wholesome factors in Buddhism